The Hildreth-Robbins House (also known as Red Wing Farm) is a historic house at 19 Maple Road in Chelmsford, Massachusetts.  The main block of the -story wood-frame house was built in three stages, most likely over the course of the second half of the 18th century.  That block is connected to a 19th-century barn (post-1860) via a long single-story ell.  The property is significant as one of the major farmsteads of south Chelmsford of the 18th and 19th centuries.  It is also distinctive as a rare 18th-century farm that was owned by a woman, Sarah Hildreth.

The house was listed on the National Register of Historic Places in 2006.

See also
National Register of Historic Places listings in Middlesex County, Massachusetts

References

Houses on the National Register of Historic Places in Middlesex County, Massachusetts
Houses completed in 1742
Chelmsford, Massachusetts
1742 establishments in Massachusetts
Georgian architecture in Massachusetts